Pushy Blueness is an album by pianist Anthony Coleman which was released on the Tzadik label in 2006.

Reception

In his review for Allmusic,  arwulf arwulf states "Anthony Coleman's Pushy Blueness was released in 2006 on John Zorn's Tzadik label, and should endure as a well-balanced sampling of his creative output during that period".

Track listing
All compositions by Anthony Coleman
 "Township Jive" - 5:25  
 "Set Into Motion" - 12:06  
 "The Hidden Agenda" - 8:38  
 "Pushy Blueness" - 15:45

Personnel
Anthony Coleman - piano, organ, mbira, khene, composer
Doug Wieselman - E-flat clarinet, bass clarinet, electric guitar (tracks 1 & 4)
Marco Cappelli - guitar (track 4)
Joseph Kubera - piano (track 3)
Jim Pugliese - percussion (tracks 1 & 4)
Track 2 performed by The Tilt Brass Band
C.J. Camerieri, Charlie Porter, Taylor Haskins - trumpet 
Chris McIntyre, Joe Fiedler - trombone
Jacob Garchik - bass trombone
Ann Ellsworth, John Clark - French horn 
Ron Caswell - tuba
Kevin Norton - percussion 
Greg Evans - conductor

References

Tzadik Records albums
Anthony Coleman albums
2006 albums